K. Pandiarajan (born 13 May 1959) popularly known as Ma Foi K. Pandiarajan is an Indian businessman and politician from Tamil Nadu. Ma Foi K. Pandiarajan is Minister of Avadi Constituency from 2016. He is the founder of Ma Foi Management Consultants Ltd, a human resource management company, and CIEL HR Services, another talent acquisition firm. He contested in the 2011 Tamil Nadu Legislative Assembly election as a Desiya Murpokku Dravida Kazhagam (DMDK) candidate and won from his Virdhunagar constituency. Again he contested in the 2016 Tamil Nadu Legislative Assembly election as an All India Anna Dravida Munnetra Kazhagam (AIADMK) candidate and won from his Avadi constituency.

Pandiarajan was appointed as Minister for School Education, Youth Welfare and Sports by former Tamil Nadu Chief Minister, J. Jayalalithaa on 29 August 2016. He remained in her cabinet until her death on 5 December 2016. He was immediately sworn into the same office by the new Chief Minister, O. Panneerselvam. He half-heartedly supported the appointment of V. K. Sasikala as General Secretary of AIADMK before deciding to support the Panneerselvam faction when Panneerselvam turned against Sasikala. He was relieved of his ministerial office when Edappadi K. Palaniswami became Chief Minister. Later, in August 2017, Panneerselvam's and Palaniswami's Factions joined and gained majority in the house. Pandiarajan was appointed as Minister for Tamil language, Tamil Culture and Archaeology.

Early life and education
K.Pandiarajan was born on 26 April 1959 in a village near Sivakasi, Virudhunagar  district. When Pandiarajan was three months old, he lost his father, a worker in a local match factory. He was brought up by his maternal grandparents.

He finished his schooling from the Sivakasi Hindu Nadar Victoria School, Sivakasi and in 1976, joined PSG College of Technology, Coimbatore for an undergraduate course in Engineering. After earning his BE (Hons) degree, Pandia Rajan enrolled for an MBA programme in Industrial Relations at Xavier Labour Relations Institute, Jamshedpur, which he completed in 1984.

Career
After graduating from XLRI in 1984, he joined the Indian operations of an industrial gas multi-national BOC Group and later Deutsche Babcock. In 1992, he co-founded Ma Foi Management Consultants along with his wife, to tap into opportunities arising out of the 1991 economic liberalisation policy in India. The initial focus of Ma Foi was placing middle-level and managerial people overseas, especially in the West Asia. In 2002, Ma Foi partnered with Editor, a Dutch head-hunter firm looking to expand their operations in West Asia and South-East Asia. He sold majority of his stake in Ma Foi to Vedior in 2004. In 2007, Dutch HR services firm Randstad acquired the operations of Ma Foi through its US$5.14 billion acquisition of Vedior. Pandiarajan became the Chairman of Randstad India.

On 5 April 2012, he announced the launch of a new venture focusing on management consulting and education space – Ma Foi Strategic Consultants Pvt. Ltd, with investments of over ₹ 250 million in the first three years. The new company had got into an agreement with Randstad for using the brand Ma Foi for three years. Pandirajan, along with a few Ma Foi veterans, made his latest foray into the HR Services industry with the launch of CIEL HR Services in August 2015. CIEL HR focuses on talent acquisition for companies and flex staffing using modern analytical tools.

Political career: 2000 – till date
Pandiarajan joined the DMDK party founded by actor turned politician Vijaykanth . He contested in the 2011 Tamil Nadu Legislative Assembly election and won from his Virdhunagar constituency with a margin of 21,286. He switched loyalties to AIADMK in 2013. On 26 February 2016, He along with 9 DMDK MLAs joined ADMK. He won as a MLA from Avadi Constituency in 2016 Tamil Nadu Legislative Assembly election as an AIADMK candidate.

In February 2017, following the appointment of Edappadi K. Palaniswami as Chief Minister in place of O. Paneerselvam, K. A. Sengottaiyan replaced Pandiarajan as Minister for School Education. Pandiarajan was the only cabinet minister to have supported Paneerselvam during a party dispute in which V. K. Sasikala was being touted as a possible Chief Minister. The appointment of Sengottaiyan was the only change made to the cabinet by Palaniswami at that time.

On 21 August 2017, with the merger of AIADMK factions headed by Edappadi K. Palaniswami and O. Panneerselvam, Pandiarajan was again sworn in as a cabinet minister with portfolios of archaeology, Tamil language and Culture.

Personal life
Pandiarajan lives in Avadi with his wife, Hemalatha. He has two children.

References

1959 births
Living people
Indian chief executives
Businesspeople from Chennai
Tamil businesspeople
Tamil Nadu MLAs 2011–2016
Desiya Murpokku Dravida Kazhagam politicians
Bharatiya Janata Party politicians from Tamil Nadu
All India Anna Dravida Munnetra Kazhagam politicians
Tamil Nadu MLAs 2016–2021
XLRI – Xavier School of Management alumni